Tapalqué Partido is a central partido of Buenos Aires Province in Argentina.

Settlements

Tapalqué
Crotto
Velloso

External links

 

1865 establishments in Argentina
Partidos of Buenos Aires Province